or The Desert Tribe is a comic strip written and illustrated by Hayao Miyazaki.

Story
The story is set in the distant past, on the fictionalised desert plains of Central Asia. Part of the story takes place in the fortified city named . The story follows the exploits of the main character, a shepherd boy of the fictional  tribe, as he tries to evade the mounted militia of the nomadic  tribe. In order to restore peace to the realm, Tem rallies his remaining compatriots and rebels against the Kittāru's attempts to gain control of the Sokut territory and enslave its inhabitants through military force.

Background, publication and influences
Miyazaki initially wanted to become a manga artist but started his professional career as an animator for Toei Animation in 1963. Here he worked on animated television series and animated feature-length films for theatrical release. He never abandoned his childhood dream of becoming a manga artist completely, however, and his professional debut as a manga creator came in 1969 with the publication of his manga interpretation of Puss 'n Boots, which was serialized in 12 weekly instalments in the Sunday edition of Tokyo Shimbun, from January to March 1969. Printed in colour and created for promotional purposes in conjunction with his work on Toei's animated film of the same title, directed by Kimio Yabuki.

In 1969 pseudonymous serialization also started of Miyazaki's original manga . This strip was created in the style of  he read in boys' magazines and Tankōbon volumes while growing up, such as Soji Yamakawa's  and in particular Tetsuji Fukushima's . Miyazaki's People of the Desert is a continuation of that tradition. In People of the Desert expository text is presented separately from the monochrome artwork but Miyazaki progressively used additional text balloons inside the panels for dialogue.

The strip was published under the pseudonym .

The strip has been identified as a precursor for Miyazaki's manga Nausicaä of the Valley of the Wind (1982–1995) and the one-off graphic novel Shuna's Journey (1983), published by Tokuma Shoten.

Citations

Cited sources

External links
 As Desert Tribe on Nausicaa.net.

Comics by Hayao Miyazaki
1969 manga